Stripping Cane is the second solo album from American singer/songwriter Jeffrey Foucault, released in 2004.

Reception

Writing for Allmusic, critic Jason McNeil wrote that "The thread that seems to hold this album so tightly is how Foucault paints a vivid vignette with simple turns of phrases, especially on the lovely toe-tapping "The Bluest Blade," a song that can't truly be appreciated after just one listen." David Kleiner of Minor 7th wrote Foucault's "sharply realized stories rise out of the darker side of the Appalachian tradition, murder ballads and lonesome love... the tunes are deep set in the sound of the mountains, stripped down front porch music just a mite rough: little flash, all atmosphere, finger picking six string, banjo, slide guitar, and mandolin fills... Because Foucault believes "what's beautiful is broken," "Stripping Cane" is relentlessly downbeat and almost relentlessly down tempo." Writing for No Depression, music critic Scott Brodeur wrote of the album "Musically, Foucault’s tunes bounce between the percussive guitar-picking blues of Chris Smither, the sparse songs of Greg Brown, and the acoustic playfulness of Leo Kottke... Lyrically, the songwriter’s plains poetry — he’s originally from southeastern Wisconsin — is filled with landscape similes and captivating tales of wanderlust and loss... Foucault is a bright young star on the Americana scene."

Track listing 
All songs by Jeffrey Foucault unless noted.
 "Cross of Flowers" - 4:21
 "Mayfly" - 3:34
 "Doubletree" - 3:15
 "Stripping Cane" - 4:25
 "The Bluest Blade" - 3:24
 "Pearl Handled Pistol" - 4:35
 "Northbound 35" - 5:08
 "4&20 Blues" - 2:58
 "Don't Look for Me" - 3:05
 "Tropic of Cancer" - 3:55
 "Lodi" (John Fogerty) - 2:53
 "Every New Leaf Over" - 3:57

Personnel
 Jeffrey Foucault - acoustic guitar, banjo, vocals 
David Goodrich - guitar, banjo, slide guitar, mandolin, drums
Kevin Barry - lap steel guitar
Peter Mulvey - guitar, background vocals
Anita Suhanin - background vocals
Kris Delmhorst - background vocals, fiddle
Production notes:
 Produced by David Goodrich
 Mixed by David Goodrich and Mark Thayer
 Mastered by Bob St. John
 Design and photography by Jason Kruppa and Kris Delmhorst

References

External links
 Official Jeffrey Foucault website
Signature Sounds Recordings

2004 albums
Jeffrey Foucault albums